Vestgrensa (originally Ullevål Haveby) was a light rail station on the Sognsvann Line of the Oslo Metro in Norway. It opened on 10 October 1934, and was located between Blindern and Ullevål stadion stations. The station was rebuilt when the Sognsvann Line was upgraded from light rail to metro standard in the early 1990s. It was closed on 22 August 1999, when it was replaced by the new station Forskningsparken.

History
Ullevål Haveby station opened on 10 October 1934, when Akersbanerne had built a light rail line from Majorstuen to Sognsvann. The line was double-tracked from Majorstuen to Korsvoll (now Østhorn), and single-tracked from there to Sognsvann. On 21 February 1939, the section from Korsvoll to Sognsvann was upgraded to double tracks, and the station Korsvoll had its name changed to Østhorn. Ullevål Haveby station changed also name, to Vestgrensa, to avoid confusion with the northbound Ullevål stadion station.

Vestgrensa was part of Holmenkolbanen's operating network until 1975, when the municipality of Oslo bought all the company's stock. In the early 1990s, the stations on the Sognsvann Line were upgraded to metro standard, which involved a heightening and lengthening of the platforms, and installation of a third rail power supply and a new signaling system. The electrified third rail made it impossible for passengers to cross at track level, and under- or overpasses had to be built at all stations.

In 1992, the transport authorities of Oslo decided to close Nordberg and Frøen stations, on the grounds that these stations were too expensive to maintain. The platforms at Vestgrensa were moved a few metres to adjust to the metro trains. Seven years later, on 22 August 1999, Vestgrensa was closed and replaced with the newly opened Forskningsparken Station.

Location
Vestgrensa was located in the Ullevål Hageby neighbourhood in Oslo, between the Oslo Innovation Center and the football stadium Ullevaal Stadion. The station was positioned on an elevated embankment, some metres from a bridge over a pedestrian walkway also named Vestgrensa. The station served the residential area in Ullevål Hageby, as well as the University of Oslo at Blindern. A scout hut was in many years located close to the station.

Footnotes

Notes

Bibliography

Oslo Metro stations in Oslo
Railway stations opened in 1934
Railway stations closed in 1999
Disused Oslo Metro stations
1934 establishments in Norway
1999 disestablishments in Norway